First Snow is a 2006 thriller starring Guy Pearce and directed by Mark Fergus. The film was released on March 23, 2007.

Plot
Slick salesman Jimmy Starks (Pearce) has auto problems in a small New Mexico town and while his car is in the shop he visits low-rent fortune teller Vacaro (J.K. Simmons) to pass the time. The supposed seer tells him he will have good fortune soon, but looking deeper relates the information that his future is blank, and he is safe only until the first snow of winter beyond which there is no future to foretell. The act upsets Jimmy and rekindles old transgressions and makes him feel he is on a collision course with destiny especially when an old friend Vincent (Shea Whigham) returns from a jail sentence that was longer because Jimmy "sold him out." Jimmy becomes obsessed with knowing more of his future and re-visits Vacaro but the old man can only tell the salesman that he has related to him all he can see. Jimmy feels that Vincent has returned to kill him and that he must do something to change the course of his future but Vacaro convinces him to accept his fate.

One theme referenced in the film (by the radio announcer) is the idea of the Sword of Damocles.

Cast
 Guy Pearce as Jimmy Starks
 Piper Perabo as Dierdre
 J. K. Simmons as Vacaro
 William Fichtner as Ed
 Rick Gonzalez as Andy Lopez
 Shea Whigham as Vincent
 Jackie Burroughs as Maggie
 Adam Scott as Tom Morelane
 Portia Dawson as Tavern Waitress Marci
 Luce Rains as Roy Harrison
Dave Mallow (voice, uncredited) as Radio Announcer

Critical reception
, the film holds a 58% approval rating on aggregator website Rotten Tomatoes, based on 74 reviews with an average rating of 5.9/10. The website's critics consensus reads: "In First Snow, an interesting premise gives way to a slow and tedious noir that adds little to the genre."

Home media 
First Snow was released on Blu-ray in Italy on 6 July 2010, France 1 April 2011 and in the United States 16 June 2020.

References

External links

Yahoo! Movies entry

2006 films
2006 psychological thriller films
American psychological thriller films
Films scored by Cliff Martinez
Films set in New Mexico
Films shot in New Mexico
Films with screenplays by Mark Fergus and Hawk Ostby
2006 directorial debut films
2000s English-language films
2000s American films